Pesme bratstva, detinjstva & potomstva: Antologija ex YU rok poezije 1967 - 2007 (trans. Songs of Brotherhood, Childhood & Offspring: Anthology of Ex YU Rock Poetry 1967 - 2007) is a book by Serbian author, journalist and music critic Petar Janjatović. Published in 2008, the book is the second, expanded edition of Janjatović's 1993 book Pesme bratstva & detinjstva: Antologija rok poezije SFR Jugoslavije 1967 - 1991 (Songs of Brotherhood & Childhood: Anthology of Rock Poetry in SFR Yugoslavia 1967 - 1991). The book features lyrics by acts from the former Yugoslav rock scene and the scenes of the successor states.

Background
In the original (1993) introduction, entitled "Od Osmeha do plavog neba" ("From Smile to Blue Sky", referencing Grupa 220's song "Osmeh" and Obojeni Program's track "Nebo, nebo plavo je"), Janjatović states his intention of presenting a selection of poetic lyrics written by Yugoslav rock musicians. According to the author, the appearance of poetic lyrics in Yugoslav rock occurred right away with the release of the first full-length Yugoslav rock album — Grupa 220's Naši dani (Our Days) — despite the fact that during the 1960s and early 1970s the poets among Yugoslav rock lyricists were still few and far between. In Janjatović's opinion, it wasn't until punk rock and new wave took root in the country that Yugoslav acts made artistic rock lyrics imperative.

Additionally, Janjatović stated:

In the 2008 addendum to the original introduction, Janjatović wrote:

Authors

Notable absences
In a 2012 interview, Janjatović was asked why there are no Đorđe Balašević lyrics in the book. Janjatović answered:

References

2008 non-fiction books
Books by Petar Janjatović
Music books
Poetry anthologies
Yugoslav rock music
Serbian rock music